The Kaiparowits Formation is a sedimentary rock formation found in the Kaiparowits Plateau in Grand Staircase–Escalante National Monument, in the southern part of Utah in the western United States.  It is over 2800 feet (850 m) thick, and is Campanian in age.  This Upper Cretaceous formation was formed from alluvial floodplains of large rivers in coastal southern Laramidia; sandstone beds are the deposit of rivers, and mudstone beds represent floodplain deposits.  It is fossiliferous, with most specimens from the lower half of the formation, but exploration is only comparatively recent, with most work being done since 1982. It has been estimated that less than 10% of the Kaiparowits formation has been explored for fossils. Most fieldwork has been conducted by The Natural History Museum of Utah.

Age
Traditionally, the Kaiparowits Formation has been considered to be roughly equivalent in age to the northern Dinosaur Park Formation. This, combined with the differences in fauna between the two formations, has led some scientists, most notably Scott Sampson, to conclude that there was some kind of barrier separating northern and southern Laramidia at this time. However, preliminary re-calibration of late Cretaceous formation correlations suggests that the upper part of the Kaiparowits, where many of the unique species are found, is actually younger than the Dinosaur Park, and that some Kaiparowits species may in fact simply be descendants of Dinosaur Park species. However, new dates reveal that this is simply an artifact of inaccurate Ar-Ar dating, and both formations had similar ages.

According to new Uranium-Lead stratigraphic data, the Kaiparowits dates from about 77.3 to 74.9 million years ago.

Biostratigraphy
The timeline below follows the re-calibrated timeline of Fowler (2017), showing species from the Kaiparowits Formation in green, and related species from Alberta in blue.

Habitat
The Kaiparowits Formation is a muddy bed that was deposited between about 77.3 to 74.9 million years ago, in the area where the Grand Staircase–Escalante National Monument of Utah is today. It is extremely fossil rich, with thousands of plants and animal fossils being preserved in amongst its sandstone and mudstone deposits. Based on plants remains including multiple vines, leaves, and branches, It was assumed by paleontologists Scott Sampson and his colleagues that Utah in the Campanian was a dense jungle bordering the Western Interior Seaway. The jungle theory would also support why almost all the animals in the Kaiparowits Formation were new species, and why the deposits were so plentiful. Without the need for herbivores to migrate to find food, and theropods to migrate after herbivores, a whole ecosystem could evolve secluded from interbreeding. The theory also supported why the dinosaurs adorned such features like the 15 horns of Kosmoceratops, they were for sexual selection.

Paleofauna

Animals present include chondrichthyans (sharks and rays), gars, bowfin, sturgeons, frogs, salamanders, turtles, lizards, crocodilians (including Deinosuchus), coelurosaurian theropods such as dromaeosaurids, troodontids, and Ornithomimus velox, armored dinosaurs, the duckbill Parasaurolophus cyrtocristatus, and a variety of early mammals including multituberculates, marsupials, and insectivorans. Recent finds include large specimens of the duckbill Gryposaurus, including the species G. monumentensis, and the first described remains of the oviraptorosaurian Hagryphus giganteus.

Trace fossils are also known from the Kaiparowits, including an excellently preserved hadrosaur skin impression known from a recent analysis by Herrero and Farke.

Turtles

Neosuchians

Ornithischians

Theropods

See also 
 List of dinosaur-bearing rock formations

References

Bibliography 
  

 
Geologic formations of Utah
Upper Cretaceous Series of North America
Cretaceous geology of Utah
Mudstone formations
Sandstone formations
Fluvial deposits
Paleontology in Utah
Grand Staircase–Escalante National Monument